"Breathless" is a song by Irish pop rock group the Corrs. It was released in June 2000 as the first single from their third studio album, In Blue (2000). "Breathless" was co-written and produced by famed music producer Robert John "Mutt" Lange, who produced for Shania Twain, Bryan Adams and Def Leppard, among others. "Breathless" is a pop song with lyrics about seduction.

"Breathless" reached number one in the Czech Republic and the United Kingdom—their only British chart-topper to date. It was the 33rd-highest-selling single in the United Kingdom in 2000. It also reached the top five in Ireland, Italy, New Zealand, Spain, and Sweden, as well as number seven in Australia. In the United States, it peaked at number 34 in March 2001, giving the Corrs their only US top-forty hit. In 2001, the song was nominated for a Grammy Award for Best Pop Performance by a Duo or Group with Vocals but lost to "Cousin Dupree" by Steely Dan.

A music video was filmed in the Mojave Desert at the Trona Airport (TRH) in Inyo County, California, on 24 May 2000 and was directed by Nigel Dick.

Background and release
"Breathless", a pop song, was written by the Corrs (Andrea, Caroline, Sharon and Jim) and Robert "Mutt" Lange, who also produced the track. The song was released as In Blues first single in June 2000. The CD single includes "Breathless" and two new tracks: "Head in the Air" and "Judy". In the United Kingdom, a CD and cassette single were distributed on 3 July 2000.

Speaking of working with Lange, Andrea said: "We happened to meet up [with Lange], and we both liked what each other does, so we decided to try and write a song together. So we did, and the first song we wrote together was 'Breathless.' It was a beautiful, sunny day when we wrote it," she continued, "and I think that's very much in the song, because it's kind of high impact and driven and sunny and summery and it's a love song. It's about seduction and how when you're falling in love, you're just enticing that person to go one step further. It's good, good fun."

An acoustic version was made for their 2002 live album, VH1 Presents: The Corrs, Live in Dublin. The song was also included on their two compilation albums, Best of The Corrs and Dreams: The Ultimate Corrs Collection.

Reception

Critical response
Critics were divided over "Breathless". Steven McDonald of AllMusic picked the song as one of the best tracks on the album. Mel Roberts of Amazon.com called it "one of the standout tracks" on the album. For Chris Charles of BBC News, the song "chugs along at Blondie pace before petering out into a wailing imitation of Dolores O'Riordan." Entertainment.ie review was mixed, writing that "Even half-decent efforts such as current single 'Breathless' are ruined by the MOR production."

Jane Stevenson of Canadian website Jam! considered "Breathless" "one of the album's weaker songs". Steven Wells of NME was positive, praising "the incredibly beautiful Andrea basically begging you to get on with it and shag her 'breathless'," writing that "Andrea does a fantastic yodel-type thing with her voice." The reviewers from People magazine called the song "saccharine", while Jake C. Taylor of Sputnikmusic named it a "poppy hit". "Breathless" was nominated for the 2001 Grammy Award for Best Pop Performance by a Duo or Group with Vocals but lost to Steely Dan's "Cousin Dupree".

Commercial performance
The song became a mainstream success, topping the charts in three countries, while peaking inside the top ten in many other countries. In Europe, the song became a large success. In the UK, the song topped the UK Singles Chart, becoming their only number-one single there, and also their best charting-single since "Runaway", which peaked at number two. On the Irish Singles Chart, the song debuted and peaked at number three, making it their highest charting single in Ireland. In Italy, the single proved to be a huge success, debuting at number five, on 13 July 2000, and peaking at number two, on 10 August 2000. After four weeks, the single climbed again to number two, on 14 September 2000, proving to be an enduring hit.

In Australia, the song debuted at number 48 on the ARIA Singles Chart on 2 July 2000. On 6 August 2000, the song climbed to number 20. On 20 August 2000, the song peaked at number seven, remaining in the peak position for two more weeks. The single spent 20 weeks on the ARIA charts, and was certified Platinum by the Australian Recording Industry Association (ARIA), denoting shipments of 70,000 copies. In New Zealand, the song was also a success, debuting at number 32 on the RIANZ chart week of 23 July 2000. It peaked at number three on 20 August 2000, while it stayed for two non-consecutive weeks at its peak position. In the United States, the song peaked at number 34 on the Billboard Hot 100 chart, proving to be their only single to reach the top-forty. It was also a success on the Adult Contemporary and Adult Top 40 charts, peaking at number seven on the latter.

Music video

Background
The music video for the song was filmed in the Mojave Desert, California, and at Trona Airport (TRH) in Inyo County on 24 May 2000; it and was directed by Nigel Dick. Two days of on-location filming were required. Both Andrea and Sharon succumbed to heat exhaustion during the two-day shoot and were hospitalized, although they were fine the following day. "We shot the video in the Mojave Desert, just outside Los Angeles," Jim described, "and it was shot by a friend of ours, Nigel Dick. We've worked with him on quite a number of videos. We spent about two days out in the desert sun, and we kind of weren't really prepared for that type of heat."

Synopsis
The video shows the Corrs at a small airstrip performing impromptu inside a hangar in the middle of the desert. They arrive in a Douglas DC-3 airplane (the registration N26MA is clearly visible on the side) and perform the song for an audience of bikers before the final shot shows the DC-3 leaving. There are two cuts of the video. One version was more story-oriented, and shows the Corrs setting up the stage for their show with bikers arriving to see them perform. The second version focused more on a young man, apparently a worker at the airstrip, and his reaction to The Corr sisters as they sing. Both versions were released on their Best of DVD.

Track listings
Standard CD and cassette single
 "Breathless" (album version) – 3:27
 "Head in the Air" – 3:43
 "Judy" – 2:26

European CD single
 "Breathless" (album version) – 3:27
 "Head in the Air" – 3:43

Credits and personnel
Credits are adapted from the CD single liner notes.

Studios
 Recorded at Sully Studio (Vaud, Switzerland)
 Mixed at the Record Plant (Los Angeles, California, US)
 Mastered at Gateway Mastering (Portland, Maine, US)

The Corrs
 The Corrs – writing
 Andrea Corr – lead vocals, tin whistle
 Caroline Corr – vocals, drums, bodhrán, percussion
 Sharon Corr – vocals, violin
 Jim Corr – vocals, guitar, keyboards

Additional musicians
 Anthony Drennan – lead guitar, guitars
 Keith Duffy – bass guitar

Writing and production
 Robert John "Mutt" Lange – writing (as R.J. Lange), production
 Mike Shipley – mixing
 Bob Ludwig – mastering
 John Hughes – management
 Elizabeth Barrett – art direction
 Andrea Brooks – art design
 Rankin – photography

Charts

Weekly charts

Year-end charts

Certifications

Release history

Notes

References

143 Records singles
2000 singles
2000 songs
Atlantic Records singles
The Corrs songs
Lava Records singles
Music videos directed by Nigel Dick
Number-one singles in the Czech Republic
Number-one singles in Scotland
Song recordings produced by Robert John "Mutt" Lange
Songs written by Andrea Corr
Songs written by Caroline Corr
Songs written by Jim Corr
Songs written by Robert John "Mutt" Lange
Songs written by Sharon Corr
UK Singles Chart number-one singles